Janalynn Castelino (born 18 October 1998) is a multilingual singer, songwriter and doctor. Her music has been described as pop with R&B elements. She sings in many languages including English, Latin, Spanish and Hindi.

Early life 
Janalynn Joseph Castelino was born on 18 October 1998 to parents Joseph and Lorna in a Roman Catholic family and holds Italian and Indian ancestry. She is the only child and has no siblings. She was involved in performing arts since the age of 3 and sang in the church choir. During her academic life, Janalynn secured a merit of 96.36% in the 10th Grade, becoming the board exam topper of her school as well as the zone.

Career 
Castelino uploaded covers to her YouTube Channel as a hobby while studying medicine. She gained popularity in 2018, after uploading the music video Binte Dil (Love Ballad) to her YouTube Channel that garnered over 22 Million views on YouTube, followed by her popular covers of Fire On Fire and Diamonds. Her music videos have featured on YouTube's trending charts in across more than 11 countries. Janalynn's rendition of Takeaway by the Chainsmokers was described by the media as a 'recreation with a pop twist'.

Janalynn Castelino appeared in an interview on the American Songwriter Network in 2021, where she talked about her upcoming music projects.  In the same year, she featured on the English edition of the L'idea Magazine.

References

External links 

 Official website
 Janalynn Castelino at IMDb

1998 births
21st-century Indian singers
21st-century Indian women singers
Living people
Indian pop singers
Indian women singers
Italian women singers
21st-century Italian women singers
Italian pop singers